István Dömény (3 August 1899 – 6 December 1966) was a Hungarian wrestler. He competed in the Greco-Roman light heavyweight event at the 1924 Summer Olympics. He was a two-time national team champion, winning in 1925 and 1926.

References

External links
 

1899 births
1966 deaths
Olympic wrestlers of Hungary
Wrestlers at the 1924 Summer Olympics
Hungarian male sport wrestlers
Place of birth missing